Pedocal is a subdivision of the zonal soil order.  It is a class of soil which forms in semiarid and arid regions. It is rich in calcium carbonate and has low soil organic matter. With only a thin A horizon (topsoil), and intermittent precipitation calcite, other soluble minerals ordinarily removed by water may build up in the B horizon (subsoil) forming a cemented layer known as caliche. It is not used in the current United States system of soil classification but the term commonly shows up in college geology texts.

See also 
 Pedalfer
 USDA soil taxonomy

References 

Pedology
Types of soil
Alkaline soils